Buzuli is a rural locality (a selo) in Chernovsky Selsoviet of Svobodnensky District, Amur Oblast, Russia. The population is 178 as of 2018. There are 2 streets.

Geography 
Buzuli is located on the right bank of the Bolshaya Pera River, 34 km north of Svobodny (the district's administrative centre) by road. Nizhniye Buzuli is the nearest rural locality.

References 

Rural localities in Svobodnensky District